Boban Stajić (born October 6, 1993) is a Macedonian professional basketball player who plays for Pelister. He was also member of U-20 Macedonia national basketball team.

References

External links
 Adriatic League Profile
 Eurobasket.com Profile

1993 births
Living people
KK MZT Skopje players
KK Rabotnički players
Macedonian men's basketball players
Macedonian people of Serbian descent
Sportspeople from Skopje
Point guards